Oh Doctor or Oh Doctor! may refer to:

 Oh Doctor! (1917 film), an American short comedy
 Oh Doctor! (1925 film), an American comedy
 Oh, Doctor (1937 film), an American comedy starring Edward Everett Horton
 Oh Doctor, an alternate title of Hit the Ice (film), a 1943 Abbott and Costello comedy
 "Oh Doctor", a song by Mando Diao from the album Ghosts&Phantoms

See also
 Oh No Doctor!, a 1934 British comedy